Năpădeni is a village in Ungheni District, Moldova.

Notable people
 Mihai Coscodan (1940–2016), professor, a member of the first Parliament of the Republic of Moldova 1990-1994 (Moldovan parliamentary election, 1990) and it is one of the signers of Declaration of Independence, the Government, in diplomatic mission

References

Villages of Ungheni District